Emmanuel Philibert of Savoy (Italian Emanuele Filiberto di Savoia), a name shared by several members of the House of Savoy, may refer to:

 Emmanuel Philibert, Duke of Savoy (1528–1580), a.k.a. "Testa di Ferro" ("Iron head"), sovereign of Savoy from 1553 to 1580
 Emmanuel Philibert of Savoy (1588–1624), Viceroy of Sicily, son of Charles Emmanuel I of Savoy 
 Emmanuel Philibert, Prince of Carignano (1628–1709)
 Emmanuel Philibert of Carignano (1662–1676), Count of Dreux, son of Eugene Maurice, Count of Soissons
 Prince Emanuele Filiberto, Duke of Aosta (1731–1735), son of Charles Emmanuel III
  (1888–1933), of the Counts of Villafranca, a minor branch of the House of Savoy
 Prince Emanuele Filiberto, Duke of Aosta (1869–1931), eldest son of Amadeo I of Spain, Italian general of World War I
 Emanuele Filiberto of Savoy, Prince of Venice (born 1972), member of the House of Savoy

Military 
Several military units were named after one of the above Savoy princes:
  (1893–1920)
 2nd Cavalry Division "Emanuele Filiberto Testa di Ferro" (1930–1943), a military unit of Italy in World War II
  (1932–1959)

See also 
 Emanuel Philibert de Lalaing (1557–1590), military commander, governor of Hainaut, godson of Emmanuel Philibert, Duke of Savoy and then governor-general of the Low Countries
  (1525–1582), magistrate and historian of the Duchy of Savoy
 , (1557–1616), Italian military leader, of the Androgna family
 Philibert-Emmanuel de Froulay, chevalier de Tessé (1651–1701), French general